Creelman is a surname of Scottish Lowlands and later Ulster-Scottish origin.

Origin of name
Creelman is thought to have originated from an occupational name, derived from creel, which refers to a wicker basket used for putting fish inside.

Distribution of name

United Kingdom

Scotland
In the mid-19th century, concentrations of people bearing the name Creelman were living in Scottish Lowland counties of Ayrshire, Lanarkshire, Midlothian, and Roxburghshire.  The 1841 Census reports 54 people bearing the surname with 29 hailing from Ayrshire, 7 from Lanarkshire, 7 from Midlothian, and 5 from Roxburghshire.   The 1851 census has 34 Creelmans living in Ayrshire, 11 in Roxburghshire, 8 in Lanarkshire, 5 in Fife, and 4 in Orkney.  1861 sees 24 Creelmans in Lanarkshire, 12 in Ayrshire, 9 in Orkney, 7 in Renfrewshire, just 2 in Roxburghshire, and 1 each in Fife and Midlothian.

By the turn of the 20th-century however, most Scots with the surname Creelman lived in Dumbartonshire, Lanarkshire, Renfrewshire, and in the far north in Orkney.  The 1871 Scottish Census reported a total of 62 Creelmans - 30 in Lanarkshire, 10 in Orkney, 9 in Ayrshire, 5 in Selkirkshire, and 4 in Midlothian.  1881 saw 15 Creelmans in Renfrewshire, 13 in Lanarkshire, 10 in Orkney, 9 in Ayrshire, 4 in Argyll, 3 in Selkirkshire, 3 in Midlothian, and 2 in Dumbartonshire.  The 1891 census lists 60 Creelmans - 21 living in Renfrewshire, 16 in Lanarkshire, 13 in Orkney, 4 in Dumbartonshire, 3 in West Lothian, 2 in Argyll, 1 in Midlothian, and none in Ayrshire.  Finally, the 1901 Scottish Census lists 105 Creelmans, with 33 living in Renfrewshire, 32 in Lanarkshire, 15 Dumbartonshire, 15 Orkney, 8 in West Lothian, 1 in Midlothian, and 1 in Argyll. .

Ulster
Ayrshire Creelmans migrated to Ulster during the 17th century.  A concentration settled in the Coleraine and Limavady area of County Londonderry.  Large numbers live in County Antrim as well.

England
Information gathered by Ancestry.co.uk on English Census reports has a  "Robt Creelman" of Suffolk as the only Creelman to be recorded in the 1841 English census.  The 1851 census recorded three Creelmans in Northumberland bordering Scotland and one in Northamptonshire.  The 1861 census records but one Creelman again, an "H. Creelman" in Lancashire.  The 1871 English census however records 15 Creelmans, with more 9 living in Warwickshire.  Similarly, the 1881 census lists 12 Creelmans in total and 10 in Warwickshire.  The 1891 Census lists 25 Creelmans in England with concentrations in Warwickshire, London, and Yorkshire.  Finally, the 1901 census lists 39 English Creelmans living mostly in Warwickshire and London, but with none in Yorkshire.

North America

Canada
In 1756 three brothers Samuel, Matthew and Francis Creelman emigrated from Coleraine, County Londonderry,  Modern day Northern Ireland  to Nova Scotia. Samuel settled in Upper Stewiacke, Cobequid District, and the other two elsewhere. All three grew prosperous 

A concentration of Creelmans lived in Grey County, Ontario in the mid-19th century according to the 1851 Census report of Canada West.

United States

The first Creelman to appear on a United States Federal Census was "Wm Creelman" in 1820.  The 1830 census reported 4 Creelmans, 2 in Fayette County, Indiana, 1 in Essex, Massachusetts, and 1 in  Buncombe County, North Carolina.  By 1840, 5 Creelmans officially resided in the U.S., 2 in Monroe, Michigan, 1 in Essex still, 1 in Monroe, New York, and 1 in Allegheny, Pennsylvania.

The 1850 U.S. Federal Census lists 42 Creelmans -  11 in "Monroe" (either Michigan or New York), 9 in Allegheny, 8 in Philadelphia, 7 in Essex, 2 in "Randolph", 1 in Hamilton County, Ohio and 1 in Wayne County, Michigan.  1860 reports 58 Creelmans with concentrations in Allgheny, "Suffolk", Washtenaw County, Michigan, "Pierce", Philadelphia, Monroe, Hamilton, and "Lee". 

By 1920 there were 298 Creelmans reported in the federal census with the following concentrations: 29 in Philadelphia,  19 in Hamilton, Ohio, 18 in Middlesex, Massachusetts, 17 in Hartford, Connecticut, 17 in San Diego, 14 in New York, New York including 6 in Queens, 14 in Hennepin County, Minnesota, 9 in Providence, Rhode Island, 7 in Kings County, California, 6 in Monroe, New York, 6 in Mahoning County, Ohio, 6 in Allegheny, 6 in Skagit County, Washington, and 6 in Campbell County, Kentucky. 

The 1930 Census shows concentrations of the 373 Creelmans listed in the same locales as well as 20 in Cook County, Illinois, 13 in Hudson County, New Jersey, and 11 in Essex County, New Jersey

People with the surname
Alice Creelman (1858–1952), American artist and art dealer 
Debra-Jean Creelman, former member of indie group Mother Mother
James Creelman - late Canadian-born American journalist, grandson of Limavady migrants to Montreal
James Ashmore Creelman - son of James Creelman, late Hollywood screenwriter
Lyle Creelman, of West Vancouver, British Columbia, late Chief Nursing Officer of the World Health Organization and made Officer of the Order of Canada in 1971.
Samuel Creelman, Stewiacke, Nova Scotia politician
Sharon Creelman, of Windsor, Ontario - former Canadian international field hockey player and national team head coach
William J. Creelman, recipient of a peacetime Medal of Honor in the United States

People descended from Creelmans
Angus Creelman Ree, Canadian politician

Places named after a Creelman
Creelman, Saskatchewan, named after a CPR surveyor named Creelman who surveyed the area
Creelman Township, in the Ontario Nickel Belt
Creelman Drive, in Dartmouth, Nova Scotia
Creelman Street, at the campus of Mississippi State University in Starkville
Creelman Avenue in Vancouver, British Columbia
Creelman Hall at the University of Guelph, Ontario named after George Creelman above

References

English-language surnames
Occupational surnames
Surnames of Lowland Scottish origin
Surnames of Ulster-Scottish origin